464 Megaira (prov. designation:  or ) is a dark and large background asteroid, approximately  in diameter, located in the central region of the asteroid belt. It was discovered by astronomer Max Wolf at the Heidelberg Observatory in southwest Germany on 9 January 1901. The carbonaceous C-type asteroid (FX) has a rotation period of 12.9 hours. It was named after Megaera from Greek mythology.

Orbit and classification 

Megaira is a non-family asteroid of the main belt's background population when applying the hierarchical clustering method to its proper orbital elements. It orbits the Sun in the central asteroid belt at a distance of 2.2–3.4 AU once every 4 years and 8 months (1,712 days; semi-major axis of 2.8 AU). Its orbit has an eccentricity of 0.21 and an inclination of 10° with respect to the ecliptic. The body's observation arc begins at Heidelberg Observatory with its official discovery observation on 9 January 1901.

Naming 

This minor planet was named after Megaera, the avenging spirit from Greek mythology. She is one of the three Erinyes (Furies), who bring retribution on those guilty of sins. The  was also mentioned in The Names of the Minor Planets by Paul Herget in 1955. It was the first numbered minor planet detected in the 20th century.

Physical characteristics 

In the Tholen classification-SMASS classification, Megaira is closest to a dark F-type asteroid, and somewhat similar to an X-type, though with an unusual (U) and noisy spectra. In the Bus–Binzel SMASS classification it is a common carbonaceous C-type asteroid.

Rotation period 

In March 2019, a rotational lightcurve of Megaira was obtained from photometric observations by Frederick Pilcher. Lightcurve analysis gave a well-defined rotation period of  hours with a brightness variation of  magnitude. The result supersedes previously published period determinations.

Diameter and albedo 

According to the surveys carried out by the Infrared Astronomical Satellite IRAS, the Japanese Akari satellite and the NEOWISE mission of NASA's Wide-field Infrared Survey Explorer, Megaira measures between 55.09 and 85.50 kilometers in diameter and its surface has an albedo between 0.03 and 0.06. The Collaborative Asteroid Lightcurve Link takes an albedo of 0.0469 from Petr Pravec's revised WISE data and calculates a diameter of 78.29 kilometers based on an absolute magnitude of 9.47.

References

External links 
 Lightcurve Database Query (LCDB), at www.minorplanet.info
 Dictionary of Minor Planet Names, Google books
 Asteroids and comets rotation curves, CdR – Geneva Observatory, Raoul Behrend
 Discovery Circumstances: Numbered Minor Planets (1)-(5000) – Minor Planet Center
 
 

000464
Discoveries by Max Wolf
Named minor planets
000464
000464
19010109

vec:Lista de asteroidi#464 Megaira